Gelo is one of a number of towns in Mozambique.  This is the one near the port of Nacala.

Gelo is served by a station on the Nacala Railway in the north of Mozambique.

See also 

 Railway stations in Mozambique

References 

Populated places in Nampula Province